Psaltoda magnifica, commonly known as the green baron, is a species of cicada native to northern Queensland in eastern Australia.

References

Hemiptera of Australia
Insects described in 1984
Psaltodini